Dwight Kay (born May 5, 1947) is a former Republican member of the Illinois General Assembly.

Kay is a 1970 graduate of Taylor University. Kay served as Vice President for Cassens Transport. He unsuccessfully ran for the General Assembly in 2008 and was involved in the effort to impeach Illinois Governor Rod Blagojevich. He was elected to the Illinois General Assembly in 2010.

Kay then lost his seat in the 2016 election with 48.4% of the vote, to Katie Stuart's 51.6%.

Electoral history

Sources
Representative Dwight Kay (R) 112th District at the Illinois General Assembly
By session: 98th, 97th
Dwight Kay for State Representative

References

1947 births
Republican Party members of the Illinois House of Representatives
Taylor University alumni
Living people
21st-century American politicians
People from Wheaton, Illinois
People from Glen Carbon, Illinois